In biochemistry, NAD(P) may refer to:

 NAD, nicotinamide adenine dinucleotide
 NADP, nicotinamide adenine dinucleotide phosphate